Ruyzat or Roveyzat may refer to:
 Ruyzat-e Sofla